Hard Feelings may refer to:

Hard Feelings (film), 1982 Canadian drama film
Hard Feelings, 1983 play by Doug Lucie about Oxbridge dropouts, televised as an episode of Play for Today (1984) with Frances Barber, Jenifer Landor and Ian Reddington 
Hard Feelings (album), 2018 album by American metalcore band blessthefall
"Hard Feelings/Loveless", by Lorde
"Hard Feelings", a 2018 song by Poppy from Am I a Girl?
"Hard Feelings", a 2018 song by Gucci Mane from Evil Genius